Charles John Thomas McCann (September 2, 1934 – April 8, 2018) was an American actor, comedian, puppeteer, commercial presenter and television host. He was best known for his work in presenting children's television programming and animation, as well as his own program The Chuck McCann Show and he also recorded comedy parody style albums.

Career

Early work
In 1958, at the age of 23, Chuck McCann portrayed a very convincing Oliver Hardy opposite Dick Van Dyke as Stan Laurel on The Dick Van Dyke show. They had previously done the sketch in the late 1950s on The Gary Moore Show before either actor was well known.   
McCann worked his way up to regional star status by apprenticing on a number of other children's shows, such as Captain Kangaroo in the 1960s. The best-selling The First Family, an early 1960s LP record album which lampooned the newly elected United States President John F. Kennedy and his family, included McCann among its voices.

Until 1975, McCann hosted comedy/variety TV puppet shows in the New York area with Paul Ashley, featuring the Paul Ashley Puppets. Together, they did The Puppet Hotel for WNTA-TV, Channel 13; then Laurel & Hardy & Chuck, Let's Have Fun, and The Chuck McCann Show for WPIX, Channel 11; and finally, The Chuck McCann Show, The Great Bombo's Magic Cartoon Circus Lunchtime Show, and Chuck McCann's Laurel and Hardy Show for WNEW-TV, Channel 5. In addition, Chuck was the comedy sidekick on WPIX's long-running rock music showcase, The Clay Cole Show. During this time, McCann appeared at many New York area venues, including Palisades Amusement Park and Freedomland U.S.A., to meet and entertain children. At Freedomland, McCann hosted a yo-yo contest, filmed several Halloween specials, filmed a WPIX Freedomland special with other children's show hosts  and appeared with Clay Cole at the park's Moon Bowl entertainment venue that featured celebrity singers and other performers. McCann's ties to Freedomland are featured in the book Freedomland U.S.A.: The Definitive History (Theme Park Press, 2019).

By the end of the 1960s, he had appeared in the 1968 film The Heart Is a Lonely Hunter and performed regularly on CBS's The Garry Moore Show.

He began an animation acting career, doing everything from Bob Kane's Cool McCool to Sonny the Cuckoo Bird ("I'm cuckoo for Cocoa Puffs" and "Ripe for Rice Krispies!") in commercials for General Mills. He had even been one of the stars of Turn-On, producer George Schlatter's offshoot of Laugh-In.

1970s television
In the 1970s, McCann's life and career shifted west, and he relocated to Los Angeles. He made frequent guest appearances on network television shows including Little House on the Prairie, Bonanza, Columbo, The Rockford Files and The Bob Newhart Show. He appeared in the 1973 made-for-TV movie The Girl Most Likely to... and was a regular on Norman Lear's All That Glitters.

In addition, he co-starred with Bob Denver in CBS's Saturday-morning sitcom Far Out Space Nuts, which he co-created. The 1970s also brought him fame in a long-running series of commercials for Right Guard antiperspirant: he was the enthusiastic neighbor with the catch phrase "Hi, guy!" who appeared on the other side of a shared medicine cabinet, opposite actor Bill Fiore.

McCann appeared as Wally Stone in Season Two of Starsky and Hutch in an episode named Murder on Stage 17 in which he played an ex-comedian turned murderer. In this episode, McCann's talent as an actor was spotlighted and he was able to portray various characters throughout the episode.

McCann impersonated Oliver Hardy in commercials for various products (teaming with Jim MacGeorge as Stan Laurel), and for a few years, he played the holiday-season recurring role of Kris Kringle on the NBC soap opera Santa Barbara. In 1965, he and John McCabe were two of the five founding members of the now worldwide society of The Sons of the Desert, an appreciation club for the works of Laurel and Hardy. He had a role in Kojak in 1974.

Film
After The Heart Is a Lonely Hunter, McCann's motion picture career took a turn back into comedy with many supporting roles and a co-starring turn (with Tim Conway) in They Went That-A-Way & That-A-Way (1978).

His most notable post-Hunter films were The Projectionist (1971), Jennifer on My Mind (1971), Linda Lovelace for President (1975), Foul Play (1978), C.H.O.M.P.S. (1979), The Comeback Trail (1982), Hamburger: The Motion Picture (1986), Thrashin' (1986) and Herbie Rides Again (1974), where he played Loostgarten, president of Loostgarten Wrecking Company.

He had a supporting role in the 1988 horror film Cameron's Closet. He had a brief appearance in Mel Brooks' 1993 comedy film Robin Hood: Men in Tights as a villager and also appeared as an innkeeper in another Brooks production; Dracula: Dead and Loving It in 1995.

Return to roots
In 1980, McCann and Paul Ashley were reunited for a pair of TV show pilots: Tiny TV, a satirical/variety puppet series aimed at adults for the cable market, and LBS Children's Theater, a children's film anthology show where McCann and the Paul Ashley Puppets were to introduce reruns of primetime animated TV specials and theatrical cartoons from Europe. However, Paul Ashley was forced to leave the projects when he proved to be suffering from Alzheimer's disease. Tiny TV never reached fruition, but LBS Children's Theater was picked up for national syndication in 1983. McCann emceed the series alone because Ashley did not live long enough to see the show, having died on September 3, 1984.

In the 1980s, McCann reprised a number of his best sketches from his New York television days as interstitial material for a two-hour presentation of cartoons on KCOP-TV, Channel 13 in Los Angeles, assisted by Bob Ridgely. McCann also voiced characters for various projects by The Walt Disney Company, such as Dreamfinder in the theme park attraction Journey Into Imagination, and several characters including Duckworth, Burger Beagle and Bouncer Beagle in the 1987 animated series DuckTales.

In 1989, McCann returned to daily children's television one more time with Chuck McCann's Funstuff, produced by fellow New York kid show legend Sonny Fox. Chuck McCann's Funstuff was seen weekday mornings on KHJ-TV from Monday, September 18, 1989 until Friday, October 13, 1989.

1990s
In the 1990s, McCann co-founded and participated in Yarmy's Army, a group of comedians and character actors of his generation who gathered regularly to cheer up Don Adams' brother Dick Yarmy, who was dying of cancer. A group with a massive array of comic talent, its members included Harvey Korman, Shelley Berman, Tim Conway, and many others.

After Yarmy's death, the group stayed together to cheer themselves up since increasing age and health problems made it increasingly more difficult for them to get steady work. In addition to having monthly dinners, they performed in various group-directed shows in select venues around the country.

McCann continued voice work for cartoons, playing Jollo, Bookworm, Bump-On-A-Log, and Woof in 1992's King's Quest VI: Heir Today, Gone Tomorrow. One of his best-known voiceover roles was The Thing in the Fantastic Four and Hulk animated series, as well as the villain Blizzard in another animated adaptation, Iron Man.

He also played Heff Heffalump, a recurring not-so-villainous character in Disney's The New Adventures of Winnie The Pooh. He was also the voice of Leatherneck on the second season of G.I. Joe. Throughout the 1990s and into the new millennium, he has been in commercials at Christmas time, he has played Santa Claus for one product or another—and TV/movie gigs (Sabrina, the Teenage Witch).

2000s–2010s

In the 2000s, McCann appeared in They Call Him Sasquatch (2003) and Dorf da Bingo King (with his old pal, Tim Conway). He supplied voices for The Powerpuff Girls and Mickey's Twice Upon a Christmas. He moved into the field of video games, providing voices for True Crime: New York City. He made an appearance in The Aristocrats (2005), with an animated rendition of a "clean" version of the "dirty" joke that serves as the movie's subject.

In 2006-07 he made appearances on The Radio Adventures of Dr. Floyd as Benjamin Franklin and Dr. Floyd's father. He has also made multiple appearances as a judge on Boston Legal, including the two-hour series finale in December 2008. In 2007, McCann played the villain Dalton Kern on the radio drama Adventures in Odyssey and also Navarro and Buck in Random! Cartoons.

In 2013, McCann voiced Moseph "Moe" Mastro Giovanni on an episode of Adventure Time, Mayor Grafton on The Garfield Show, and reprised Duckworth, Bouncer Beagle and Burger Beagle in DuckTales Remastered. In 2016, he reprised the role of the Amoeba Boys in the 2016 reboot of The Powerpuff Girls. In 2017, McCann recorded a comedy podcast program, "Trump: The Last Family" with Kevin Sean Michaels, a modern send-up to the best-selling The First Family LP of the 1960s.

Personal life
McCann was born in Brooklyn, New York, to a bandleader/singer father. He was a close friend of Hugh Hefner and a regular at the Playboy Mansion.

Death
McCann died on April 8, 2018 of congestive heart failure in Cedars-Sinai Medical Center in Los Angeles at the age of 83. He was cremated and his remains are in Forest Lawn Memorial Park, at the 'Dawn of Tomorrow' section, 'Columbarium of Tenderness', left-side (southeast wall), Outdoor Garden Niche 6396 (7 rows up from bottom, 5 columns in from left corner).

He is survived by his third wife, Betty Fanning and two daughters from his second marriage. His son Sean, from his first marriage, died in 2009.

Selected filmography

Film

Television

Video games

References

External links
 
 
 
Paul Ashley Puppets
 November 2006 interview on The Zigory Show (SOLID VOX Network)
 Trump: The Last Family on Friend Or Foe (Stitcher)
 Chuck McCann profile, Aveleyman.com

1934 births
2018 deaths
American male voice actors
American male radio actors
American male film actors
American male stage actors
American male television actors
American male child actors
Burials at Forest Lawn Memorial Park (Glendale)
Male actors from New York City
People from Brooklyn
20th-century American male actors
21st-century American male actors